The 2003–04 Drexel Dragons men's basketball team represented Drexel University during the 2003–04 NCAA Division I men's basketball season. The Dragons, led by 3rd year head coach Bruiser Flint, played their home games at the Daskalakis Athletic Center and were members of the Colonial Athletic Association.

Roster

Schedule

|-
!colspan=9 style="background:#F8B800; color:#002663;"| Regular season
|-

|-
!colspan=9 style="background:#F8B800; color:#002663;"| CAA Regular Season

|-
!colspan=9 style="background:#F8B800; color:#002663;"| CAA tournament

|-
!colspan=9 style="background:#F8B800; color:#002663;"| National Invitation Tournament

Awards
Bruiser Flint
CAA Coach Of The Year

Sean Brooks
CAA All-Conference Second Team

Phil Goss
CAA All-Conference First Team
CAA Player of the Week

Bashir Mason
CAA Defensive Player of the Year
CAA All-Defensive Team
CAA All-Rookie Team
CAA Rookie of the Week (2)

Tim Whitworth
CAA All-Conference Second Team
CAA Player of the Week
CAA All-Academic Team

References

Drexel Dragons men's basketball seasons
Drexel
Drexel
2003 in sports in Pennsylvania
2004 in sports in Pennsylvania